Matt Calland (born 20 August 1971) is an English former rugby league footballer who played in the 1990s and 2000s, and coached in the 2000s and 2010s.

Background
Matt Calland was born in Widnes, Lancashire, England.

Playing career

International honours
Matt Calland won a cap for England while at the Bradford Bulls in 1996 against France (sub).

Challenge Cup Final appearances
Calland played right-, i.e. number 3, in the Bradford Bulls' 32-40 defeat by St. Helens in the 1996 Challenge Cup Final during Super League I at Wembley Stadium, London on Saturday 26 April 1996. and was an interchange/substitute in the Bradford Bulls' 22-32 defeat by St. Helens in the 1997 Challenge Cup Final during Super League II at Wembley Stadium, London on Saturday 3 May 1997.

County Cup Final appearances
Calland played in Rochdale Hornets 14-24 defeat by St. Helens in the 1991 Lancashire County Cup Final during the 1991–92 season at Wilderspool Stadium, Warrington, on Sunday 20 October 1991.

Coaching career
Calland was named the assistant coach at Halifax in June 2006. Martin Hall moved upstairs in October to take up the post of director of football. He was then named the new head coach of Halifax. On 26 September 2010 against all odds he masterminded a 23 -22 comeback against red-hot favourites Featherstone Rovers. They came back from 22 – 4 to win in extra time thanks to a Ben Black drop goal. It was the first trophy Halifax had won in 23 years.

References

External links

1971 births
Living people
Bradford Bulls players
England national rugby league team players
English rugby league coaches
English rugby league players
Featherstone Rovers players
Halifax R.L.F.C. coaches
Huddersfield Giants players
Hull F.C. players
Rochdale Hornets coaches
Rochdale Hornets players
Rugby league centres
Rugby league players from Widnes
Rugby league second-rows
Rugby league wingers